The Clermont Residential Historic District, in Clermont, Georgia, is a  historic district which was listed on the National Register of Historic Places in 1985.

It includes parts of Main, Harris, Martin, and Railroad Streets.  The listing included 18 contributing buildings.

It includes:
Haynes Residence, a two-story, wood-framed, Victorian Eclectic structure on the east side of Main Street
Roark House, a two-story, wood-framed Neoclassical-style structure with central monumental portico and one-story porch across the front facade
Frank Rogers House, Classical Revival,  on the west side of Railroad Street at the northwest corner of its intersection with Martin Street.

References

Historic districts on the National Register of Historic Places in Georgia (U.S. state)
National Register of Historic Places in Hall County, Georgia